Huda Abason Oleru (born 3 December 1975) is a Ugandan Politician and legislator who was the Women Member of Parliament Representative for Yumbe District in the Eighth and Ninth parliament of Uganda. She was Independent but she is now affiliated to National Resistance Movement political Party. She was also the Minister of State for Veteran Affairs.

Early life and education 
Huda was to  Ayub Adiga (father) and Drakai Khadija (mother) of Pania village, Kophi sub-county in Yumbe district. Huda went to Limidia Primary School before joining Yumbe Secondary School. She then Joined Mvara Secondary School. After her secondary education, Huda joined Islamic University in Uganda (IUIU)  where she attained her Bachelor's Degree in Public Administration. Before joining Politics, Huda also attained a Master's degree in Public Administration and Management.

Career 
Huda worked as a teacher at Aringa Primary School and she was also the secretary for the youth of Romogi sub-county before joining politics. She was also the National Resistance Council Youth general secretary in Romogi Sub-county in 1996. Between 1996-1998, she was a teacher at Limitia Primary School. She was the Community Facilitator with Community Actor Programme between 1998 to 2000. Between 2000 to 2003, Huda was the Investment chairperson for Lulu sub-county.

Personal life 
Huda is married to Mohammed Abason Ingamule.

See also 
List of members of the eighth Parliament of Uganda

Yumbe District

Naima Melsa Gule Avako

Zaitun Driwaru

External links 
 Yumbe District Local Government
 Website of the Parliament of Uganda

References 

1975 births
Living people
People from Yumbe District
Ugandan Muslims
Women members of the Parliament of Uganda
Islamic University in Uganda alumni
People from West Nile sub-region
People educated at Mvara Secondary School
People from Northern Region, Uganda
Members of the Parliament of Uganda
Independent politicians in Uganda
National Resistance Movement politicians